The 1989 Malta International Football Tournament  (known as the Rothmans Tournament for sponsorship reasons) was the fourth edition of the Malta International Tournament. The competition was played between 8 and 12 February, with games hosted at the National Stadium in Ta' Qali.

Matches

Winner

Statistics

Goalscorers

See also 
China Cup
Cyprus International Football Tournament

References 

1988–89 in Maltese football
1989 in Danish football
1989